Yury Ivanovich Blinov (born January 13, 1949 in Moscow, Soviet Union) is a retired ice hockey player who played in the Soviet Hockey League.  He played for HC CSKA Moscow.  He was also a member of the Soviet team for the Summit Series against Canada.  He was inducted into the Russian and Soviet Hockey Hall of Fame in 1972.

References 
 Russian and Soviet Hockey Hall of Fame bio

1949 births
Living people
HC CSKA Moscow players
Ice hockey people from Moscow
Olympic medalists in ice hockey
Olympic ice hockey players of the Soviet Union
Ice hockey players at the 1972 Winter Olympics
Medalists at the 1972 Winter Olympics
Olympic gold medalists for the Soviet Union